The North Adelaide Football Club (1888) originally known as the Hotham Football Club prior to 1888 was an Australian rules football club based in South Australia.

An Annual General meeting was held at Wednesday 16 March 1881 at Princess Royal Hotel, North Adelaide during which it was agreed that they retain their Dark Blue Colours from the previous season.

At an Annual General meeting held on 7 April 1884 of the Hotham and Triton Football Clubs it was agreed that the Clubs would merge under the Hothams.

At Annual General meeting held at Huntsman Hotel, North Adelaide on 4 March 1885 it was reported out of 12 games - there was 5 wins and 7 losses.

The Club was premiers of the Adelaide and Suburban Association in 1885 (winning all 12 games played)  and 1886 (defeating Creswick in a Premiership Playoff)

It participated in the South Australian Football Association in 1887 SAFA season and 1888 SAFA season playing most of its matches at Kensington and Adelaide Ovals.

At a meeting held on 13 March 1888, after adopting a recommendation to merge with the Ariel Club, it was also unanimously agreed by members to also renamed the Club from Hotham to North Adelaide for 1888 season. The club would also add a blue hoop to their red and white guernseys and wear blue and white hose (so as not to clash with the new club Medindie whose colours were also Red and White).

At North Adelaide’s Annual General Meeting on 13 March 1889 it was resolved for officials to have merger discussions with the Medindie Club.
However, on 25 March 1889 the club dissolved following a merger with the Adelaide Club for the 1889 Season.

Notable player for the club was the Captain for the 1887 and 1888 Seasons - Jack 'Dinny' Reedman. He moved to South Adelaide when Notham/North Adelaide merged with Adelaide for 1889. He also played and Captained North Adelaide (including Premierships in 1900,1902 and 1905) and was a successful Coach at West Adelaide. Reedman held the SANFL games record of 319 until 1970.  In 1996, he was inducted into the Australian Football Hall of Fame in 1996 and in 2002, he was inducted into the South Australian Football Hall of Fame. Reedman also played and Captain South Australia in Cricket and played one Test for Australia.

SAFA Honour Roll
1887 - 1888 Captain - Jack Reedman
1887 Leading Goalkicker - Hosken (13 goals)

References 

Australian rules football clubs in South Australia
North Adelaide